Amikam Aharoni (1929–2002) was an Israeli physicist who has made numerous contributions to the fields of magnetism.

Education
Born in Safed, Aharoni received a M.A. in physics from Hebrew University in 1953 and a Ph.D. in physics from the Weizmann Institute in 1957. His thesis was on magnetoresistive memory elements. His postdoc work with John Bardeen took him to the University of Illinois during 1958-1959. In 1971-1972, 1977–1978, and 1992 he was a senior research fellow in the Department of Metallurgy at the University of Oxford. In 1972 he was promoted to professor in the Department of Electronics at Weizmann Institute, and in 1978 he was appointed the Richard Kronstein Professor of Theoretical Magnetism.

Research

Awards
Distinguished Lecturer of the IEEE Magnetics Society of 1993.

References

1929 births
2002 deaths
20th-century Israeli physicists
Academic staff of Weizmann Institute of Science
Israeli Jews
Jewish scientists
Jewish physicists
Weizmann Institute of Science alumni